The Big Bash League (known as the KFC Big Bash League for sponsorship reasons, often abbreviated to BBL or Big Bash) is an Australian professional club Twenty20 cricket league, which was established in 2011 by Cricket Australia. The Big Bash League replaced the previous competition, the KFC Twenty20 Big Bash, and features eight city-based franchises instead of the six state teams which had participated previously. The competition has been sponsored by fast food-chicken outlet KFC since its inception. It was in 2016/17 one of the two T20 cricket leagues, alongside the Indian Premier League, to feature amongst the top ten domestic sport leagues in average attendance. The winner of BBL 12 (2022/2023) was the Perth Scorchers, who beat the Brisbane Heat by 5 wickets in the final.

BBL matches are played in Australia during the summer, in December, January and February. 

Out of the eight teams in the tournament, six have won the title at least once. The Perth Scorchers are the most successful team in the league's short history, having won the title five times including consecutively for two years twice. The Sydney Sixers have won the title three times, including consecutively for two years. The other four teams that have won the title are the Adelaide Strikers, Melbourne Renegades, Brisbane Heat and Sydney Thunder.

Before 2014, the top two teams in the tournament used to qualify for the Champions League Twenty20 tournament, which was an annual international Twenty20 competition played between the top domestic teams from various nations.  The Champions League Twenty20 became defunct after its 2014 tournament.

History

Trophy
A design contest was held in 2011 to determine the design of the Big Bash League trophy. The competition was restricted to Australian designers, with the final design, chosen by the public from a field of three, revealed on 13 December 2011.

Expansion proposal

It had been proposed that the tournament would undergo expansion into more regional areas not supported by international cricket. The expansion was originally planned to be implemented in 2012. The proposed teams included: Newcastle, Canberra, Geelong, and Gold Coast. A New Zealand-based team was also mentioned as a possibility which would be based at Auckland or Christchurch, but this is unlikely to happen.  The expansion proposal was suspended, mainly because the proposed cities lacked the proper cricket hosting facilities.

In 2015, former Black Caps captain and Melbourne Stars coach Stephen Fleming suggested the expansion of the tournament to include New Zealand teams and become a trans-Tasman competition. He said an expansion into New Zealand would be widely supported by locals. His views were also supported by Brisbane Heat coach and former Black Caps captain Daniel Vettori. Melbourne Renegades chief executive Stuart Coventry also stated that he wants Cricket Australia to grant each club a fifth home fixture next season. Coventry said the BBL was ready to expand from 8 to 10 games, and adding matches would further establish the franchises.

In 2016, Anthony Everard, head of the BBL, flagged the league's intentions to approach expansion through a soft launch. He stated the short to medium term goal was to schedule BBL games involving existing franchises in regional markets before potentially adding new teams after the 2017–18 season when the broadcast deal expired. He also indicated the regional markets of Canberra, Geelong, Launceston, and Gold Coast will likely host games during the soft launch period. On 27 January 2017, Everard announced an extra eight matches would be added to the 2017–18 season and implored each existing franchise to look at new markets when considering where the extra games would be played, although the lengthened season was not implemented until 2018–19.

In 2018, it was reported that the Gold Coast Suns were interested in securing a Big Bash League franchise if the competition was expanded.

Women's Big Bash League

Former women's Test captain and Head of Brisbane's Centre of Excellence, Belinda Clark, revealed on 19 January 2014 that planning for a women's BBL was in its early stages but could become a reality very soon. She stated that the proposal was being considered due to the huge rise in television ratings during the 2013–14 season, and the rise in women's cricket popularity.

On 19 February 2015, Cricket Australia announced that a Women's Big Bash League (WBBL) would commence in the 2015–16 season, with teams aligned to the men's competition. It was announced that the teams would share the names and colours of the existing men's BBL teams, meaning that there would be two teams from Sydney and Melbourne and one team from Adelaide, Brisbane, Hobart, and Perth.

The inaugural Women's Big Bash League was won by the Sydney Thunder against the Sydney Sixers by 3 wickets. The current champion from the 2022–23 Women's Big Bash League season is Adelaide Strikers who won their maiden WBBL title by defeating Sydney Thunder by 10 runs.

Christmas Day match
In December 2015, Cricket Australia revealed that they are looking into the possibility of hosting a Christmas Day BBL match in the coming years, possibly after the next season. If the proposal is passed, it would be a first in the history of Australian sport since no professional matches are played in Australia on Christmas Day. "It is something we have just recently started discussing, the possibilities of that. We're talking about playing a Christmas Eve match, we already play Boxing Day," CA's Executive GM (Operations) Mike McKenna said. This has not yet occurred, but in September 2018, it was reported that Cricket Australia had struck a deal with the Players Association to play BBL matches on Christmas Day.

Tournament format

Since the inception of the BBL in 2011, the tournament has followed the same format every year except the inaugural season. The first BBL season had 28 group stage matches, before expanding to 32 in the following season.

Since the 2018–19 season, each team plays all other teams twice during a season, for a total of 56 regular season matches before the finals series.

In previous seasons of the tournament, the group stage matches were divided into eight rounds, with four matches played in each round. Each team played six other teams once during a season, and one team twice. This allowed for both Sydney and Melbourne (which have two teams each) to play 2 derbies within a single season. Each team played eight group stage matches, four at home and four away, before the top four ranked teams progressed to the semi finals. In the 2017/18 Season, the format changed so that there would be 40 group stage matches with each team playing 10 matches before the semi finals. The season was held over a similar time-frame thus resulting in more doubleheaders (one game afternoon, one game night) and teams playing more regularly.

The final of the tournament is played at the home ground of the highest-ranked team. The only exception to this rule was 2014–15 season when the final was played at a neutral venue (Manuka Oval), due to the 2015 Cricket World Cup.

In the 2018–19 season, the league introduced a 'bat flip' (instead of a coin toss) to decide who would bat/bowl first.

The finals structure was changed in the 2019–20 season to include a fifth team. The structure was a hybrid version of the Page–McIntyre final four system with the addition of ‘The Eliminator’ being the difference between the original and the hybrid versions.:

Home team listed first

The Eliminator (Elimination Final)- Fourth v Fifth  

The Qualifier (Second Semi-Final)- First v Second

The Knock-Out (First Semi-Final)- Third v Winner of The Eliminator

 The Challenger (Preliminary Final)- Loser of The Qualifier v Winner of The Knock-Out

The Final (Grand Final)- Winner of The Qualifier v Winner of The Challenger

In order to give BBL a boost for the 2020–21 season, Cricket Australia decided to introduce three new rules—Power Surge, X-Factor Player and the Bash Boost.

Current teams
The competition features eight city-based franchises, instead of the six state-based teams which had previously competed in the KFC Twenty20 Big Bash. Each state's capital city features one team, with Sydney and Melbourne featuring two. The team names and colours for all teams were officially announced on 6 April 2011. The Melbourne Derby and Sydney Derby matches are some of the most heavily attended matches during the league and are widely anticipated by the fans. The Scorchers and Sixers have also developed a rivalry between them over the years and their matches attract good crowds and TV ratings.

A single city-based franchise can have a maximum of 19 contracted players for a season, with the squad including a minimum of two rookie contracts and a maximum of six overseas players, although only three international players can play in each match from 2020 to 2021 edition. Each team can also have a maximum of two overseas replacement players, in case the original overseas players get injured or withdraw.

Rivalries
Throughout the history of the tournament rivalries have been formed by competition between teams and by teams being in the same city.

Sydney Smash 
The Sydney Smash is a game between the Sydney based teams, the Sydney Sixers and Sydney Thunder. This rivalry was started in the inaugural season due to both teams being from Sydney and being made up of New South Wales cricket team players. The Sixers have won 16 times to the Thunder's 7 but the game still attracts a large crowd for every game.

Melbourne Derby
The Melbourne Derby takes place between the two Melbourne based teams, the Melbourne Renegades and the Melbourne Stars. This derby is similar in nature to the Sydney Smash as the cores of both teams come from the Victoria cricket team and has been happening since the inaugural season of the competition. In BBL05 the game drew the largest crowd for a Big Bash game with 80,883 fans attending the game at the MCG.

Perth Scorchers - Sydney Sixers
The Scorchers/Sixers rivalry has developed over the competition's 12 seasons due to their unparalleled success. The Scorchers have won the title five times and Sixers have claimed the trophy three times. No other team has been champions more than once. The Scorchers and the Sixers have both been runners up three times. They've met in the final on five occasions. The Scorchers have won three of those encounters and the Sixers two.

Tournament season and results
The Perth Scorchers have won 5 titles in the 2013–14, 2014–15, and 2016–17, 2021–22, 2022–23 seasons and the Sydney Sixers in the 2011–12, 2019–20, and 2020–21 seasons.
Both of these teams have won the title in consecutive seasons.

The Scorchers have reached the final of the tournament eight times. Out of the eight teams in the tournament, six have won the title at least once. Only two other teams (the Hobart Hurricanes and Melbourne Stars) have reached the final at least twice The other four teams which have won the title once are the Brisbane Heat in the second season (2012–13), the Sydney Thunder in (2015–16), the Adelaide Strikers in (2017–18), and the Melbourne Renegades in (2018–19).

The WACA Ground has hosted the final on four occasions, the most of any venue.

Team summary by season

Notes:
 W = Winner; 
 R = Runner-up; 
 SF = Semifinalist; 
 EF = Eliminated in "The Eliminator" Final (4th vs 5th) (from 2020); 
 KO = Knocked-out in "The Knock-Out" Final (3rd vs winner of the Eliminator) (from 2020); 
 CF = Eliminated in "The Challenger" Final (loser of the Qualifier vs winner of the Knock-Out) (from 2020);
 TBD = To be Decided;

 (1–8) = End of league games table position;

Champions

Wooden Spoons 
The wooden spoon in Big Bash League is an imaginary and ironic "award" which is said to be won by the team finishing in last place in the Big Bash League.

Summary

Season-wise records

Sponsorship
Title Sponsor
 KFC (2011/12 – present)

Associate Sponsor
 Weet-Bix
 Toyota
 Wrigley Extra
 Commonwealth Bank
 BKT Tires
 Woolworths
 Dream11

Apparel Sponsor
 Nike (Team Apparel)
 '47 (Caps/Hats)

Broadcast Partners
 Fox Cricket
 Seven Network
 Sports Entertainment Network (1116 SEN)

Radio Partners 

 ABC Radio
 Radio Australia (Outside Australia)
 Macquarie Sports Radio

Salary cap

The salary cap was initially $1 million, and increased to $1.05 million for the third season. In February 2015, the salary cap increased to $1.3 million for the fifth season, and to $1.6 million for the sixth season.

Prize money
Cricket Australia increased the prize money for the BBL to a total of $890,000 for the four finalists from 2015–16 season, after the Champions League Twenty20 tournament was discontinued with effect from 2015. The prize money will be split between the teams as follows:

$20,000 – To the team finishing fifth in the season
$80,000 – To each losing semi-finalist
$260,000 – To the Runner up 
$450,000 – To the Champion of the season

However, the additional cash increase of $600,000 will go to successful clubs and not their players. Up to the 2014–15 BBL season, a total prize money of $290,000 was awarded.

Audience

Attendance

Average home crowds for the regular season are listed below. These figures do not include finals matches. The figures for the whole season average include the finals. Post-Christmas matches have historically been the highest attended period for the League. BBL has provided a platform to create interest in playing cricket among younger children, due to its big hitting, high scoring and entertaining nature of the game.

The 2014–15 season saw record domestic cricket crowds in the states of South Australia, New South Wales, Tasmania and the ACT, including a record attendance of 52,633 at the Adelaide Strikers' home semi-final, which was then the biggest ever crowd at the redeveloped Adelaide Oval.

In the 2015–16 season, attendance figure records continued to be broken across all the venues. Perth Scorchers became the first ever BBL team to sell out all of its home matches in a season. On 2 January 2016, the BBL single match attendance record was surpassed, with a crowd of 80,883 watching the first of two Melbourne derbies between the Melbourne Stars and the Melbourne Renegades at the Melbourne Cricket Ground. The Big Bash League also entered the top 10 most attended sports leagues in the world with respect to average crowd per match in this season.

^COVID-19 affected season

*Season still in progress

**Played one home game during the season due to COVID-19

Television

Australian television
BBL games are currently broadcast in Australia on free-to-air television by the Seven Network and subscription television by Fox Cricket. The Seven Network broadcasts 45 of 61 Matches including the Finals Series. Fox Cricket televises all 61 Matches including 16 Matches exclusively in 4K.

The rights were previously held by Network 10, who in 2013 paid $100 million for BBL rights over five years, marking the channel's first foray in elite cricket coverage.

Network 10's BBL coverage became a regular feature of Australian summers and attracted an average audience of more than 943,000 people nationally in 2014–15 season, including a peak audience of 1.9 million viewers for the final between the Scorchers and Sixers.

The 2015–16 season attracted an average audience of 1.13 million for each match in Australia this season, an 18% increase over the previous season. A cumulative audience of 9.65 million watched the matches in Australia, out of which 39% were women. The opening Sydney Derby match of the season attracted a peak audience of 1.53 million. The last group match between Renegades and Strikers in Session 2 was watched by an average audience of 1.36 million, which peaked at 1.67 million. The BBL Final was watched by an average audience of 1.79 million, which peaked at 2.24 million viewers. This was the first time that the ratings for a BBL match crossed the 2 million mark. The KFC BBL|10 Final reached 2.5 million viewers on Seven and 669,000 on Foxtel, capping an extraordinary season in which as players, officials, staff and broadcast partners successfully navigated through the many challenges presented by the COVID-19 pandemic.

Broadcasters
The eleventh season of the big bash league will reach more fans than ever before.

Grounds

A total of 17 grounds have been used to host BBL matches to date. Sydney Thunder moved out of ANZ Stadium after 2014–15 season and relocated to Sydney Showground Stadium for the next 10 years. From 2020, the tournament Final has been played at the home ground of the team that wins 'The Qualifier', a playoff match contested between the 2 teams finishing 1st and 2nd in the League. The WACA Ground has hosted the final 4 times, more times than any other venue. Manuka Oval hosted the final of 2014–15 BBL season as a neutral venue primarily because other major grounds were being prepared for the 2015 Cricket World Cup.

Optus Stadium replaced the WACA Ground as the home ground of Perth Scorchers starting with the 2017–18 BBL semi-finals. Perth's home match against Hobart Hurricanes (and a doubleheader WBBL match featuring the Perth Scorchers and Sydney Thunder) became only the second public event at the new stadium.

In September 2017, the Adelaide Strikers agreed to play one home BBL and WBBL match at Traeger Park in Alice Springs over the course of the 2017–18 season. In 2018, they announced that one BBL and two WBBL matches would be held at Traeger Park for the 2018–19 and 2019–20 seasons. 

Since 2017–18, the Melbourne Renegades have played two matches per season at Kardinia Park in Geelong, Victoria and the Hobart Hurricanes play multiple games at UTAS Stadium in Launceston, Tasmania.

Records and statistics

Here is a list of Big Bash League records. All records are based on statistics at espncricinfo.com. Former Brisbane Heat player and captain Chris Lynn currently holds the record of scoring most runs in the league. The record of taking most wickets in the league belongs to Sean Abbott who currently plays for the Sydney Sixers. He has represented the Sydney Thunder in the past.

Last updated on 30 January 2022

See also

The Big Appeal
Caribbean Premier League
Cricket in Australia
List of Big Bash League centuries
List of Big Bash League records and statistics
Pakistan Super League
Indian Premier League
Bangladesh Premier League
Lanka Premier League
Everest Premier League
Prime Minister One Day Cup
The Hundred (100-Ball Cricket League)

Notes

References

External links
 
 Schedule & Fixtures
 World Cricket Badger

 
Australian domestic cricket competitions
Professional sports leagues in Australia
Professional cricket leagues
2011 establishments in Australia
Sports leagues established in 2011
Twenty20 cricket leagues
Recurring sporting events established in 2011